The World's Most Beautiful Swindlers (French: Les plus belles escroqueries du monde) is a 1964 film composed of five segments, each of which was created with a different set of writers, directors, and actors.

Cast
Mie Hama as Bar Hostess (segment "Les Cinq Bienfaiteurs de Fumiko")
Ken Mitsuda as the Rich Client (segment "Les Cinq Bienfaiteurs de Fumiko")
Nicole Karen as the French tourist (segment "La rivière de diamants")
Jan Teulings as  Dutch man (segment "La rivière de diamants")
Gabriella Giorgelli (segment "La Feuille de Route")
Guido Guiseppone (segment "La Feuille de Route")
Giuseppe Mannajuolo (segment "La Feuille de Route")
Jean-Pierre Cassel as Alain des Arcys (segment "L'homme qui vendit la Tour Eiffel")
Francis Blanche as  Mr. Umlaut (segment "L'homme qui vendit la Tour Eiffel")
Catherine Deneuve as  Swindler (segment "L'homme qui vendit la Tour Eiffel")
Jean Seberg as Patricia (segment "Le Grand escroc")
Charles Denner as the Con Man (segment "Le Grand escroc")
Laszlo Szabo as the Police Inspector (segment "Le Grand escroc")

Release
Les plus belles escroqueries du monde was released in France in August 1964, in Italy in 1964 and in Japan on 4 October 1964. The film was released in the United States by Ellis Films and Continental Distributing. It was released in the United States on 12 September 1967.

The film was unavailable for many decades, until it was restored and released on home video in France on 23 September 2016 and in the US on 25 April 2017.

Roman Polanski's segment of the film, "La rivière de diamants" ("A River of Diamonds"), has been removed, at his direct request, and that portion is thus still unavailable.

References

External links

 The World's Most Beautiful Swindlers Blu-ray review at 10kbullets.com

Japanese crime comedy films
French crime comedy films
Italian crime comedy films
Dutch crime comedy films
French anthology films
Italian anthology films
Japanese anthology films
1964 films
1960s crime comedy films
Films directed by Roman Polanski
Films directed by Ugo Gregoretti
Films directed by Claude Chabrol
Films directed by Jean-Luc Godard
Films scored by Krzysztof Komeda
Films scored by Piero Umiliani
Films scored by Serge Gainsbourg
Films with screenplays by Paul Gégauff
Films with screenplays by Roman Polanski
Films shot in Tokyo
Films shot in Amsterdam
Films shot in Naples
Films shot in Paris
Films shot in Morocco
Japanese multilingual films
French multilingual films
Dutch multilingual films
Italian multilingual films
1964 comedy films
1964 drama films
1960s Japanese films
1960s Italian films
1960s French films